The DSC Prize for South Asian Literature is an international literary prize awarded annually to writers of any ethnicity or nationality writing about South Asia themes such as culture, politics, history, or people. It is for an original full-length novel written in English, or translated into English. The award is for novels published in the year preceding the judging of the prize. The winner receives 25,000 USD. The DSC Prize was instituted by Surina Narula and Manhad Narula in 2010 and its vision is to showcase and reward the best writing about the South Asian region and bring it to a global audience.

Winners and shortlist

Notes

External links
 DSC Prize for South Asian Literature, official site

Asian literary awards
Indian literary awards
Awards established in 2010
Pakistani literary awards
Nepalese literary awards